Kincheloe Creek is a stream in the U.S. state of West Virginia.

The creek was named after the local Kincheloe family.

See also
List of rivers of West Virginia

References

Rivers of Harrison County, West Virginia
Rivers of Lewis County, West Virginia
Rivers of West Virginia